Sir William Henry Rycroft  (1861 – 1925) was a British army officer who rose to the rank of Major-General, and colonial governor of British North Borneo.

Biography
Rycroft was the second of six children of Sir Nelson Rycroft, 4th Baronet, and his wife Juliana Ogilvy. His elder brother Richard became the 5th baronet.

Rycroft was educated at Eton College and the Royal Military College, Sandhurst. He enlisted in the British Army in 1871. In 1879 he was appointed to the 71st (Highland) Regiment of Foot which became part of the Highland Light Infantry in 1881. He took part in the Gordon Relief Expedition in 1884–85. He transferred to the 7th Dragoon Guards in 1886, attended the Staff College, Camberley, 1891–1892, was Deputy Assistant Adjutant General at York 1895–1896, served on the North-West Frontier in India 1897–1898 and served on the Staff during the South African War 1899–1900. He served in Somaliland from 1902 to 1905, was regimental commander of the 11th Hussars from 1904 to 1908, was in South Africa again from 1911 to 1912 and was Assistant Quartermaster general (QMG) in Southern Command from 1913 to 1914. He fought in the First World War and was mentioned in despatches seven times. He was General Officer Commanding (GOC) of the 32nd Division 1915–16. He was Major-General of Administration in the Army of the Black Sea 1918–20, then Major-General of the HQ Irish Command 1920–21. A year later he retired from the army and served as governor of North Borneo from 1922 until his death. After his death, his predecessor Aylmer Cavendish Pearson took over the governorship for the second time.

Honours
Rycroft was appointed CB in the 1910 Birthday Honours, CMG "in recognition of meritorious services during the war" in 1915, and knighted KCMG "for services rendered in connection with Military Operations in the Field" in the 1918 New Year Honours. After the war he was awarded the additional knighthood of KCB "for valuable services rendered in connection with
He was a Knight of Grace of the Order of the Hospital of St John of JerusaJem.

References

External links

1861 births
1925 deaths
People educated at Eton College
Graduates of the Royal Military College, Sandhurst
British Army major generals
British Army personnel of the Mahdist War
British Army personnel of the Second Boer War
British Army generals of World War I
Governors of North Borneo
Knights Commander of the Order of the Bath
Knights Commander of the Order of St Michael and St George
Recipients of Greek civil awards and decorations
Recipients of the Medal of Military Merit (Greece)
Commandeurs of the Légion d'honneur
Knights of Grace of the Order of St John